Danish Aviation Systems is a Danish supplier and developer of unmanned aerial vehicles.

References

External links
Danish Aviation Systems official website 

Aerospace companies of Denmark
Unmanned aerial vehicle manufacturers
2009 establishments in Denmark
Danish companies established in 2009
Companies based in Roskilde Municipality
Privately held companies of Denmark